Trichordestra beanii is a species of cutworm or dart moth in the family Noctuidae. It was described by Augustus Radcliffe Grote in 1877 and is found in North America.

The MONA or Hodges number for Trichordestra beanii is 10306.

References

 Lafontaine, J. Donald & Schmidt, B. Christian (2010). "Annotated check list of the Noctuoidea (Insecta, Lepidoptera) of North America north of Mexico". ZooKeys, vol. 40, 1-239.

Further reading

External links

 Butterflies and Moths of North America

Hadenini
Moths described in 1877